State Route 309 (SR 309) is a north-south state highway located in the southwestern part of the U.S. state of Georgia. It exists entirely within Decatur County.

Route description

Southeast of Bainbridge
SR 309 begins at the Florida state line, southwest of Attapulgus. Here, the roadway continues as County Road 159 toward Havana, Florida.

SR 309 heads northwest to an intersection with SR 241 just northwest of its southern terminus. The highway continues northwest, passing through rural parts of the county, and passing through the unincorporated community of Fowlstown, before it enters Bainbridge.

Bainbridge
The highway enters Bainbridge on South West Street. It heads north to a partial interchange with US 27/US 84/SR 1/SR 38 (Wiregrass Georgia Parkway). Just north of the interchange, SR 309 meets SR 97. The two routes form a concurrency through the city. The concurrent routes continue north until they intersect US 84 Business/SR 38 Business (West Shotwell Street), where they turn right onto US 84 Business/SR 1 Business for one block. At this point, the four highways meet US 27 Business/SR 1 Business (North Broad Street). Here, SR 97/SR 309 turn left onto US 27 Business/SR 1 Business north, and US 27 Business/SR 1 Business south run concurrent along with US 84 Business/SR 38 Business (all along East Shotwell Street). About seven blocks farther north, North Broad Street meets Dothan Road and East Calhoun Street. Here, US 27 Business/SR 1 Business north depart the concurrency along Dothan Road and SR 97/SR 309 head along East Calhoun Street, while North Broad Street continues north for another block. The concurrency head northeast to an intersection with SR 311 (East River Road), just before leaving the city.

Northeast of Bainbridge
After leaving Bainbridge, SR 97/SR 309 continue to head northeast along Vada Road, until they split, where the "Vada Road" name continues along SR 97. SR 309 adopts the name "Old Pelham Road". The highway continues to the northeast until it meets its northern terminus at SR 262 (Pelham Road), north of Climax, where the roadway continues as Mars Hill Church Road.

History

Major intersections

See also

References

External links

 

309
Transportation in Decatur County, Georgia